The 2010 Real Salt Lake season was the sixth year of the club's existence. It was also the sixth year for the club in Major League Soccer and the sixth-consecutive year for the club in the top-flight of American soccer.

Real Salt Lake entered the 2010 MLS season as the defending MLS Cup champions, and participated additionally in the CONCACAF Champions League and played play-in propers of the U.S. Open Cup. During 2010, the club had the most success ever in its history, finishing second place in Major League Soccer, as well as becoming the first American-based club to win a Champions League group; in which they won Group A with a 4–1–1 record. Salt Lake played two play in propers of the Open Cup before eventually falling out against D.C. United.

In the MLS Cup playoffs, Salt Lake was paired against FC Dallas, the eventual Cup runners-up, where the Royals fell 3–2 on aggregate in the quarterfinals.

Overview

March
Real Salt Lake opened the season with a 3–0 road victory against San Jose.
MLS: 1-0-0, 3 points, 3 goals for, 0 goals against

April
RSL began April with a 2–1 loss to Houston, losing after the Dynamo earned two penalty kicks just a minute apart.  Upon heading back to Sandy, they played to a 2–2 draw against Seattle, with Álvaro Saborío scoring the equalizer in second half stoppage time, in front of a full stadium with a crowd over 20,000. A week later, they headed to Los Angeles to take on the Galaxy, the team they had defeated on penalty kicks to win MLS Cup 2009. Despite losing 2–1, Real became the first team to score on the Galaxy in the 2010 Season, as Los Angeles had shut out their first three opponents.  RSL finished April with a 1–0 loss to the reigning Supporters' Shield winners, the Columbus Crew.
MLS: 0-3-1, 1 point, 4 goals for, 7 goals against

May
RSL began with a hard-fought 2–1 home victory over Toronto. They then hosted for the first time the new expansion team, Philadelphia, winning 3–0.  The next week, they defeated Houston, who had beaten them at home in Houston in April, with a decisive 3–1 win.  Going on the road to Los Angeles to face expansion partners Chivas USA, RSL found victory when Fabián Espíndola scored in the 89th minute for the game-winner in the 2–1 win.  RSL finished the month with a close 4–1 win over Kansas City in Sandy. Both the five-game win streak and the 15-game home unbeaten streak held by RSL at the end of May are franchise-highs.
MLS: 5-0-0, 15 points, 14 goals for, 4 goals against

June
After a disappointing scoreless draw on the road against D.C. United, RSL returned home to hand Los Angeles their first loss of the season by a score of 1–0 on a controversial Javier Morales goal. After a two-week hiatus due to the 2010 FIFA World Cup, RSL drew San Jose 0-0.
MLS: 1-0-2, 5 points, 1 goal for, 0 goals against

July
July saw Robbie Findley return from World Cup play for Nick Rimando's 100th MLS win – a 5–0 drubbing of New England. They took their aggressive playing style on the road, beating the Chicago Fire 1–0. Their 10-game unbeaten streak came to an end against FC Dallas at Dallas, followed by a disappointing home draw against Chivas USA. They were back in form against D.C. United, and came away with a 3–0 win. 
MLS: 3-1-1, 10 points, 10 goals for, 3 goals against

August
RSL's good fortunes continued in August, as the team went undefeated in league play. The month opened with four games in twelve days – three league games and RSL's first CONCACAF Champions League game. After playing to a 1–1 draw with Kansas City at CommunityAmerica Ballpark, RSL paid its first visit to Philadelphia's new PPL Park, earning a point in a 1–1 draw with the Union. RSL headed back to Rio Tinto Stadium to face its 2009 Eastern Conference Semifinals nemesis Columbus. RSL won the game 2–0 on a Morales brace. The team then geared up to begin Group A play in the 2010-11 CONCACAF Champions League. RSL defeated Panamanian champions Árabe Unido in Sandy by a score of 2–1 in a wild match that featured over eight minutes of second-half stoppage time. A week later, the team traveled to Estadio Azul to play Mexico's Cruz Azul. Though RSL led 3–2 after 87 minutes, a crazy finish left Real empty-handed, falling 5–4. The team finished the month with an MLS scoreless affair at BMO Field in Toronto, leaving the team in third place on the table at 40 points with eight league games remaining.
MLS: 1-0-3, 6 points, 4 goals for, 2 goals against; CCL: 1-1-0, 3 points, 6 goals for, 6 goals against

September

September was another spectacular run for RSL, culminating in qualifying for the MLS Playoffs and the CONCACAF Champion's League quarterfinals.

October

Squad

2010 roster 

 (captain)

Reserves

Transfers

In

Out

Loan

Statistics

Appearances and goals 

Last updated on 17 November 2010.

|}

Top scorers

Disciplinary

Formation 

Starting XI vs. Colorado on Oct. 23:

Overall 

{|class="wikitable"
|-
|Games played || 40 (30 MLS, 6 CONCACAF Champions League, 2 MLS Playoffs, 2 U.S. Open Cup)
|-
|Games won || 20 (15 MLS, 4 CONCACAF Champions League, 1 U.S. Open Cup)
|-
|Games drawn ||  13 (11 MLS, 1 CONCACAF Champions League, 1 MLS Playoffs)
 |-
|Games lost || 7 (4 MLS, 1 CONCACAF Champions League, 1 MLS Playoffs, 1 U.S. Open Cup)
|-
|Goals scored || 66
|-
|Goals conceded || 36
|-
|Goal difference || +30
|-
|Clean sheets || 15
|-
|Yellow cards || 64
|-
|Red cards || 1
|-
|Worst discipline ||  Jámison Olave 10  0 
|-
|Best result(s) ||W 5–0 (H) v New England – Major League Soccer – 2 July 2010
|-
|Worst result(s) ||L 2–0 (A) v Dallas – Major League Soccer – 17 July 2010
|-
|Most appearances ||  Nat Borchers (37)
|-
|Top scorer ||   Álvaro Saborío (18)
|-
|Points || Overall: 56/90 (62.22%)
|-

Club

Coaching staff
{|class="wikitable"
|-
!Position
!Staff
|-
|General Manager|| Garth Lagerwey
|-
|Head coach|| Jason Kreis
|-
|Assistant coach|| Robin Fraser
|-
|Assistant coach|| Miles Joseph
|-
|Assistant coach|| Jeff Cassar
|-
|Strength and conditioning Coach|| Dan Barlow
|-
|Team Administrator||| Elliot Fall
|-
|Equipment Manager||| Kevin Harter
|-
|Assistant Equipment Manager||| Mike Rigby
|-
|Head Athletic Trainer|| Jake Joachim
|-
|Head Team Physician|| Andrew Cooper
|-
|Team Orthopedist|| Dr. Mark Scholl
|-
|U-17 Head Coach|| Greg Maas
|-
|U-17 Assistant Coach|| Nermin Sasivarĕvić
|-

Management

Competitions

Overall

Major League Soccer

League table
Conference

Overall

Results summary

Regular season

March

April

May

June

July

August

September

October

MLS Playoffs

Real Salt Lake qualified for the 2010 MLS Cup playoffs following a 2–1 victory at New England on October 2. Amid the controversy surrounding the playoff structure, Salt Lake was seeded as the number two team in the Western Conference bracket, drawn against the third-place West team, Dallas. The draw took place at Major League Soccer's headquarters in New York City on October 24.

The Conference Semifinals served as a two-leg, home-and-away aggregate series with no away goals rule enforced. Salt Lake played at Dallas in Pizza Hut Park on October 30. Despite an early goal from Fabian Espindola in the fifth minute, Dallas would rally with a pair of goals from Jeff Cunningham and Eric Avila, giving not only Dallas the victory, but a lead in the a series.

Both clubs would return to Rio Tinto on November 6 for the second leg. A 17th-minute goal from Dax McCarty gave Dallas 3–1 advantage in the series, and not only jeopardized Salt Lake's chance for going on the Western Conference Championship, but the chance RSL would end their home-match unbeaten streak. A goal from Robbie Findley ensured the streak would stay alive, but it was not enough to defeat Dallas on aggregate, as Dallas would advance 3–2 on aggregate.

U.S. Open Cup

CONCACAF Champions League

By winning the 2009 MLS Cup championship against Los Angeles, Real Salt Lake qualified directly into Group Stage for the 2010–11 edition of the CONCACAF Champions League. It was RSL's debut in the competition.

The draw for the group stage was held on May 19, 2010 in New York City. Salt Lake was paired with 2009 Panamanian champions Árabe Unido as well as the Mexican Professional League's, Cruz Azul and fellow MLS-opponent Toronto FC who qualified for the competition by winning the 2010 Canadian Championship.

Salt Lake's opening game took place on August 18, hosting Árabe Unido in which they won 2–1 thanks to a pair of goals from Álvaro Saborío. RSL would then head down to Mexico City's Estadio Azul to take on Cruz Azul for an August 25 match. During a part of the game, Salt Lake took a 3–1 lead over Cruz Azul, and look destined to become the first MLS club to defeat a Mexican team on Mexican soil in a meaningful competition. However, late goals from Cruz Azul's Javier Orozco gave Azul a 4–3 lead in the 89th minute. A stoppage time goal from Salt Lake's Will Johnson seemed to have savaged a point for RSL; however, a goal with less than twelve seconds remaining in stoppage time from Christian Giménez gave Cruz Azul the final goal to win 5–4.

The Royals would commence Champions League action again on September 15 hosting fellow league team, Toronto FC. In spite of an early goal from Macion Santos, RSL was able to rebound and score four unanswered goals, giving Salt Lake a 4–1 victory and a tie with Cruz Azul for first place in Group A. One week later, the Royals would travel to Panama City to take on Arabe Unido for their home fixture of pool play. Goals from Saborio and Johnson secured a 3–2 road victory for Salt Lake. With the victory, RSL became only the sixth MLS club to win a meaningful competition against a Central American opponent on their home turf. On September 28, Salt Lake qualified for the knockout stage of the tournament with a 1–1 draw against Toronto FC at BMO Field.

Tied with Cruz Azul with 3–1–1 records apiece, a victory would give Salt Lake first place in their group. Because of the late season push for the Supporters' Shield, Kries fielded primarily a second-tier squad against Cruz Azul. A record crowd came to Rio Tinto on October 19 to watch the group stage finale between the two sides. Goals from the recently acquired Paulo Araujo Jr. and from Collen Warner led to a 3–1 victory over the Cementeros. The win resulted in RSL winning Group A, as well as them becoming the first MLS club to win a Group in the CONCACAF Champions League.

On November 1, CONCACAF held the draw for the Championship Round at their headquarters in New York City. The round commenced during Salt Lake's 2011 season.

Group Standings

Results summary

Match results

Notes

Real Salt Lake seasons
Real Salt Lake
Real Salt Lake
Real Salt Lake